Edwin Whittaker (4 December 1834 – 25 June 1880) was an English cricketer active from 1863 to 1868 who played for Lancashire. He was born in Ashton-under-Lyne and died in Matlock. He appeared in 14 first-class matches as a righthanded batsman who sometimes kept wicket. He scored 291 runs with a highest score of 39 and completed four catches.

Notes

 
1834 births
1880 deaths
English cricketers
Lancashire cricketers
North v South cricketers
All-England Eleven cricketers
Gentlemen of the North cricketers